Robert Allen Dahl (born November 5, 1968) is a former American football offensive lineman.  He played in the National Football League (NFL) for the Cleveland Browns and Washington Redskins.  He played college football at the University of Notre Dame and was a member of the 1988 undefeated national championship team. Robert was drafted in the third round of the 1991 NFL Draft by the Cincinnati Bengals.

References

1968 births
Living people
American football offensive linemen
Cleveland Browns players
Notre Dame Fighting Irish football players
Washington Redskins players
Players of American football from Chicago